The 1980 Critérium du Dauphiné Libéré was the 32nd edition of the cycle race and was held from 26 May to 2 June 1980. The race started in Évian-les-Bains and finished at Mont Revard. The race was won by Johan van der Velde of the TI–Raleigh team.

Teams
Ten teams, containing a total of 100 riders, participated in the race:

Route

General classification

References

Further reading

1980
1980 in French sport
May 1980 sports events in Europe
June 1980 sports events in Europe
1980 Super Prestige Pernod